

416001–416100 

|-bgcolor=#f2f2f2
| colspan=4 align=center | 
|}

416101–416200 

|-bgcolor=#f2f2f2
| colspan=4 align=center | 
|}

416201–416300 

|-id=252
| 416252 Manuelherrera || 2003 ES || Manuel Félix Herrera Gómez (1987–2013), a PhD student who researched trans-Neptunian objects and extrasolar planets at the Institute of Astrophysics of Andalusia, in Granada, Spain || 
|-id=273
| 416273 Glennsnyder ||  || Glenn Snyder (1944–2017) earned his PhD in astrophysics from Case Western Reserve University in Ohio, and wrote code for NASA space missions until 1992. A programmer for a project at Gettysburg College in Pennsylvania, he developed astronomy software, including astrometric software, used by educators worldwide. || 
|}

416301–416400 

|-bgcolor=#f2f2f2
| colspan=4 align=center | 
|}

416401–416500 

|-bgcolor=#f2f2f2
| colspan=4 align=center | 
|}

416501–416600 

|-id=583
| 416583 Jacereece || 2004 JH || Jace Danielson (born 2021) and Reece Marshall (born 2021) are great-grandchildren of American astronomer James Whitney Young, who discovered this minor planet. || 
|}

416601–416700 

|-bgcolor=#f2f2f2
| colspan=4 align=center | 
|}

416701–416800 

|-bgcolor=#f2f2f2
| colspan=4 align=center | 
|}

416801–416900 

|-bgcolor=#f2f2f2
| colspan=4 align=center | 
|}

416901–417000 

|-bgcolor=#f2f2f2
| colspan=4 align=center | 
|}

References 

416001-417000